The Virginia Cavaliers Swimming and Diving teams represent the University of Virginia in all National Collegiate Athletic Association (NCAA) Division I Swimming and Diving Events. In 2021, the women's side won the NCAA Championship, a first for any Atlantic Coast Conference team, and finished in the national top 10 for a third consecutive season. The men's side also finished in the national top 10 for the second consecutive season. In 2022, the women won their second consecutive NCAA Championship.

History 
Swimming and diving was introduced at the University of Virginia in 1925, when it was only a men's sport. It was introduced as a women's sport in 1974. Both the men's and women's teams have been successful in the Atlantic Coast Conference, with the men having won sixteen ACC championships, and the women seventeen. The women won two consecutive NCAA Championships in 2021 and 2022. Virginia swimmers hold NCAA, U.S. Open, and American Records across multiple events.

Roster (2022-2023)

Facility

The University of Virginia Aquatic and Fitness Center opened in 1996. This building was a big accomplishment for the team, previously one of two national top 20 teams without an Olympic-sized swimming pool. The Aquatic and Fitness Center was built not only with a 50 meter Olympic-sized pool, but also with a warm-water pool, whirlpool and sauna, classrooms, fitness areas, locker rooms, a bookstore, and a dining area. The $18.5 million facility features a 50-meter pool that converts to a short course 25-yard pool, as well as state of the art lane lines and gutters. The facility underwent renovation in 2004, adding a three-court gymnasium, indoor running track, multipurpose rooms, a cycling room, and free weight and cardiovascular areas were added. Former head coach Mark Bernardino expressed his gratitude towards the building of the new facility when he said, "With this facility, we are showing our potential student-athletes that we are interested in recruiting athletes with national and international aspirations, and that we are committed to the long-term excellence of the University of Virginia swimming and diving program."

Team Records 
All times are in Short Course Yards (SCY). Red highlight denotes an American Record, and blue highlight denotes both an American Record and an NCAA Record.

Men

Women

Yearly records

Men

Women

Championships

Team NCAA Championships 
Women (2)

Team ACC Championships 
Women (18)

Men (16)

NCAA Champions

Honors

NCAA Most Valuable Player 
Women (1)

Men (1)

CSCAA Coach of the Year 
Women (2)

ACC Swimmer of the Year 
Women (14)

Men (15)

ACC Diver of the Year 

Men (1)

ACC Championships Most Valuable Swimmer 
Women (15)

Men (15)

ACC Championships Most Valuable Diver 
Women (2)

ACC Championships Most Valuable Freshman 
Women (12)

Men (8)

ACC Coach of the Year

International & Olympic History

Olympic Games

See also 
NCAA Men's Swimming and Diving Championships
NCAA Women's Swimming and Diving Championships

References

External links
 Virginia Cavaliers Swim & Dive